La Gran final (English: The Great Match) is a 2006 film directed by Gerardo Olivares.

Synopsis 
How is it possible that children living in the remotest part of the Mongolian steppes know who Ronaldo is? This  film tells the adventurous story of three heroes, none of whom have ever met, but who nevertheless have two things in common: firstly, they all live in the farthest-flung corners of the planet and, secondly, they are all three determined to see on TV the final in Japan of the 2002 World Cup between Germany and Brazil. The protagonists in this 'global' comedy are: a family of Kazakh nomads from Mongolia, a camel caravan of Tuaregs in the Sahara, and a group of indigenous people in the Amazon. They all live about 500 kilometres away from the next town—and the next television—making their task a particularly daunting one. Nevertheless, these inventive people possess the resourcefulness and the willpower to achieve their goal.

Reception

La Gran final was screened at the African Film Festival of Cordoba.
It won several international awards and was selected to participate, among others, in the Berlin International Film Festival. 
The film was an official selection at the Copenhagen International Film Festival, the Galway Film Fleadh, the World Cinema Festival, Cape Town and the Desert Nights Filmfest, Rome.
It was nominated for Best Film at the Málaga Spanish Film Festival.

See also 
 Docufiction
 List of docufiction films

References

External links
 

2006 films
German documentary films
Spanish documentary films
2006 documentary films
Documentary films about association football
Docufiction films
2002 FIFA World Cup
Spanish association football films
German association football films
FIFA World Cup in fiction
2000s German films